Miss Vietnam 2010 (Vietnamese: Hoa hậu Việt Nam 2010) was the 12th edition of the Miss Vietnam pageant. It was held on November 6, 2010, at Water Show Amphitheater, Tuần Châu, Quảng Ninh, Vietnam. Miss Vietnam 2010 contest has the theme: Vietnamese women thousand years of beauty. Đặng Thị Ngọc Hân, born in 1989, from Hanoi was crowned Miss Vietnam 2010, 1st runner-up is Vũ Hoàng My (Đồng Nai) and 2nd runner-up is Đặng Thùy Trang (Hanoi). This is the first time Miss Vietnam has a VTC media organization instead of VTV, because VTV accompanies the Miss Vietnam World 2010 contest which took place in the same period in August, before the other contest took place. week and also the last year the winner is crowned by the head of the contest organizers.

Results

Placements 

 Color keys

Special Awards

Contestants 
37 contestants in the final.

References 

Beauty pageants in Vietnam
2010 beauty pageants
Vietnamese awards